Princess consort is an official title or an informal designation that is normally accorded to the wife of a sovereign prince. The title may be used for the wife of a king if the more usual designation of queen consort is not used.

More informally, it may even be used to describe the family position of any woman who marries royalty non-morganatically, if the rank she derives from that marriage is at least that of a princess (e.g., Grace Kelly was Princess Consort during marriage, whereas Liliane Baels and Countess Juliana von Hauke are not usually so described).

The "consort" part is often dropped when speaking or writing of a princess consort, and the term is only capitalized when the title is borne officially. Currently, there are two princess consorts: one the wife of a reigning sovereign king and the other the wife of a reigning sovereign prince.

United Kingdom
In 2005, Clarence House announced that, when Camilla, Duchess of Cornwall's husband Charles, Prince of Wales accedes to the throne of the United Kingdom, she would not use the legal style of queen consort. She intended to use the style of "princess consort", even though her husband would not be a sovereign prince but a sovereign king. Such a title has no historical precedent; under English common law, wives of kings automatically become queens. This was the case with all other women married to British kings regnant—with the exception of queens co-reigning with their husbands. In 2018, Clarence House removed the statement from its website, suggesting that Camilla would be styled as queen consort upon her husband's accession. In 2020, however, Clarence House released another statement announcing that, as established at the time of the marriage, upon the accession of the Prince of Wales, Camilla would assume the title of "princess consort" with the style HRH. In her 2022 Accession Day message, published to mark the 70th anniversary of her reign, Elizabeth II stated that it was her "sincere wish" for Camilla to be known as queen consort upon Charles's accession to the throne. In the event, when Charles ascended to the throne, Camilla did in fact become Queen Consort and was referred to as such in the announcement of the late Queen's death.

Morocco
The consort of King Mohammed VI of Morocco, Princess Lalla Salma, is styled as HRH the Princess Consort, the first Moroccan royal consort to receive any title.

Current princesses consort

Notes and references

Notes

References 

British monarchy
Monarchy in Canada
 
-